The Outlets at Wind Creek Bethlehem (formerly The Shoppes at Sands and The Outlets at Sands Bethlehem) is an indoor shopping mall located inside the Wind Creek Bethlehem casino resort in Bethlehem, Pennsylvania.  It opened on November 1, 2011 and connects the casino and the hotel.  The outlet center is located under the Minsi Trail Bridge.

The Outlets at Wind Creek Bethlehem comprises  of retail space. Retailers located there include clothing, electronics, household, jewelry, and specialty-item stores, as well as Europa Spa & Salon, Joli Bakery & Cafe, and Kids Quest/Cyber Quest - a childcare and family entertainment center. At the east end of the mall is a food court, next to the casino entrance.

Tenants

As of July 12, 2017, the mall's stores include: Charming Charlie, Chico's Outlet, Coach and Coach Men's Factory Outlet, Corningware Corelle & More, DKNY, Dress Barn, Steel Magnolia Spa & Salon, Famous Footwear,  G.H. Bass & Co, Guess, Hartstrings Childrenswear, IZOD, Carlo's Bakery, Kay Jewelers, Kids Quest/Cyber Quest, Lenox, Limited Editions Eccoci Collections, Nine West, Spritz Designer Fragrances, Talbots, The Old Farmer’s Almanac General Store, Tommy Hilfiger, The Uniform Outlet, Under Armour, and Van Heusen.

References

External links

 

Outlet malls in the United States
Poarch Band of Creek Indians
Shopping malls established in 2011
Shopping malls in Northampton County, Pennsylvania